Madeline Bunch is an American entrepreneur from Santa Rosa, California.  In 1972, she and her family began the Bunch Products Company, manufacturing Old South Brand beef and pork sausages.

References

Living people
People from Santa Rosa, California
Year of birth missing (living people)
Place of birth missing (living people)
Businesspeople from California
American women in business
21st-century American women